George Burke may refer to:

 George Burke (cricketer) (1847–1920), English cricketer
 George Thew Burke (1776–1854), soldier, merchant and political figure in Upper Canada
 George J. Burke (1886–1950), judge during the Nuremberg Trials
 George Burke Jr. (1917–1947), suspect in murders of Betty Binnicker and Mary Thames